The Mask (re-released as Eyes of Hell) is a 1961 Canadian surrealist horror film produced in 3-D by Warner Bros. It was directed by Julian Roffman, and stars Paul Stevens, Claudette Nevins, and Bill Walker.

Plot
The story concerns a psychiatrist, Dr. Allen Barnes (Stevens), who obtains a mysterious ancient tribal mask after one of his patients (Radin) committed suicide. Whenever he puts on the mask, Barnes experiences dream-like visions which become increasingly disturbing and violent and even physically harming his girlfriend Pam (Nevins). The visions begin to alter Barnes' personality, and eventually drive him insane while Lt. Martin (Walker) questions those who knew him and the whereabouts of said mask.

Cast
 Paul Stevens as Doctor Allan Barnes
 Claudette Nevins as Pam Albright
 Bill Walker as Lieutenant Martin
 Anne Collings as Miss Goodrich
 Martin Lavut as Michael Radin
 Leo Leyden as Doctor Soames

Reception and legacy

Production
The Mask was the first Canadian film to be marketed extensively in the United States since the age of silent film, with its use of 3D being heavily promoted.

Release
The film was released in the United States on October 28, 1961. Specially made 3D glasses marketed as "Magic Mystic Masks" (as pictured above), were given to audience members and prompts would be shown on screen for the start of each sequence that utilized 3D.

Home media
The Mask was released for the first time on DVD on September 30, 2008, by Cheesy Flicks. In 2015, the film was restored by Toronto Film Festival and copyright holders 3-D Film Archive for theatrical and 3-D Blu-ray/DVD release from Kino Lorber.

Critical reception
The Mask received mixed to negative response from critics upon its initial release.

Howard Thompson of The New York Times commended the film's acting, and cinematography, but criticized the film's nightmare sequences, soundtrack, and melodramatic plot. Time Out panned the film, referring to it as 'a bland and hackneyed murder mystery that was spiced up by surreal nightmare sequences' and "tacky" use of 3D. Brad Wheeler of The Globe and Mail gave the film one out of four stars, offering similar criticism towards its use of 3D and plot, stating that its appeal was "limited to genre fetishists and popcorn-chomping ironists".

Some critics, however, were more favorable on the film. Chris Coffel of Bloody Disgusting felt thatin spite of the films thin storyits psychedelic visuals, make-up effects, and set pieces made it an enjoyable B-movie in the vein of William Castle.

The film has since gained a cult following over the years and is now considered a cult classic.

In 2021, the film was announced to be featured in an upcoming episode of Mystery Science Theater 3000. This episode eventually aired in both 2D and 3D formats on October 28, 2022, the 61st anniversary of the film's theatrical release.

References

Sources

Books

Websites and periodicals

External links
 
 
 
 

1960s avant-garde and experimental films
1960s 3D films
1961 films
1961 horror films
Canadian 3D films
English-language Canadian films
1960s English-language films
Films scored by Louis Applebaum
Films shot in Toronto
Canadian supernatural horror films
Surrealist films
Warner Bros. films
Films directed by Julian Roffman
1960s Canadian films